Ribadesella (Asturian: Ribeseya) is a small  municipality in the Autonomous Community of the Principality of Asturias, Spain. Known for its location on the Cantabrian Sea, at the outlet of the River Sella, Ribadesella is a town that forms part of the Picos de Europa (Peaks of Europe). It is bordered on the east by Llanes, on the south by Cangas de Onís and Parres, and on the west by Caravia. Ribadesella is the home town of Queen Letizia of Spain.

On the first weekend of August, the Descenso Internacional del Sella (International Descent of the Sella) takes place; kayakers from all over the world gather to attempt the final 20 km of the Sella River in record time. The town is also known for its prehistoric cave, known as the cave of Tito Bustillo, which is open to visitors all year round. Ribadesella is also visited for its history, sport activities, scenery, natural amenities, and food.

History

The municipality includes the Tito Bustillo Cave (Cueva de Tito Bustillo), known for prehistoric wall paintings of animals and figures, probably dating from the Magdalenian age (29,000 years ago). It's include in the Unesco World Heritage SIte Paleolithic Cave Art of Northern Spain.

The first written references to the settlement are more recent, and date from the first century BC. These come from the Greek geographer Strabo, who speaks of the River "Noega" separating "the Astures from the Cantabrians". The people of Ribadesella at this time were called the Salaeni: they dominated Colunga, Arriondas and Llanes.

The town

Ribadesella has two main streets, the Gran Vía de Agustin Argüelles, and the Calle Comercio.  In this part of Ribadesella, there are a few banks, pharmacies, restaurants/bars, stores, and newspaper stands. Here also is the Casco Antiguo, where the old plaza is located, as well as Ribadesella's church: the Iglesia Parroquial de Sta. María Magdalena. In this part of town are small shops selling homemade products, as well as the homes of Ribadesella's inhabitants. The third part of Ribadesella consists of the Paseo Marítimo del Puerto, or the Maritime Avenue of the Port.

Parishes
Berbes
Collera
Junco
Leces
Linares
Moro
Ribadesella (Capital)
Santianes
Ucio

Cultural events

The International Descent of the Sella ( Descenso Internacional del Sella) is a race that takes place every year on the first weekend of August on the banks of the River Sella, and is accompanied by a celebratory gathering (La Fiesta de Les Piragües) through the streets and plaza of Ribadesella. The race begins in Arriondas, and finishes at the end of the River Sella, located in the “center” of Ribadesella.

Other festivals are celebrated with food, music, and dancing with original bagpipe/asturiano music and traditional dress. These festivals include religious celebrations for San Antón de Cuerres, San José de Sebreñu, Nuestra Señora de Fátima de Toriellu, San Isidro, San Lorenzo, Nuestra Señora de la Asunción, Nuestra Señora de la Esperanza de Collera, and Nuestra Señora de Guía, the patron of fishermen.  The Feria del Queso (Cheese Festival) de Cuerres and La Fiesta del Pez (Fish Festival) de Tereñes are other festivals celebrated throughout Ribadesella. Semana Santa, or Easter Week is very important in Ribadesella. Processions take place daily, and a great celebration, including a horse race/spectacular on the Santa Marina beach is held each year.

Events

Descent of the Sella.

The "Guia".

References

Municipalities in Asturias

Populated coastal places in Spain